Willis Marks (August 20, 1865, Rochester, Minnesota, United States – December 6, 1952, Los Angeles, California) was an American silent film actor.

Biography
In 1888, Marks debuted on stage professionally. He acted in Oliver Morosco's stock company for nine years.He went to Hollywood in 1915, and for 20 years he portrayed older men in many films, including The Dramatic Life of Abraham Lincoln (1924), in which he played William Seward. Marks' career declined after the emergence of sound movies.

Marks was married to actress Carroll Marshall. His son, Chandler Marks, was also an actor. 

Marks' papers are housed at the University of Denver.

Partial filmography
 Secret Love (1916)
 Her Bitter Cup (1916)
 The Mysterious Mrs. M (1917)
 The Clock (1917)
 The Vanity Pool (1918)
 The Flash of Fate (1918)
 You Never Saw Such a Girl (1919)
 The Man from Funeral Range (1919)
 When a Girl Loves (1919)
 Greased Lightning (1919)
 The Virtuous Thief (1919)
 The Trembling Hour (1919)
 Over the Garden Wall (1919)
 The Family Honor (1920)
 The Dancin' Fool (1920)
 The Jack-Knife Man (1920)
 Homespun Folks (1920)
 The Little Grey Mouse (1920)
 The Beautiful Gambler (1921)
 Chickens (1921)
 The Greater Profit (1921)
 Travelin' On (1922)
 Man Under Cover (1922)
 Truxton King (1923)
 Which Shall It Be? (1924)
 His Forgotten Wife (1924)
 The Dramatic Life of Abraham Lincoln (1924)
 The Shadow on the Wall (1925)
 Shattered Lives (1925)
 The Night Ship (1925)
 Silent Pal (1925)
 Private Affairs (1925)
 The Unknown Soldier (1926)
 Rebecca of Sunnybrook Farm (1932)

References

External links

A guide to the Willis Marks Papers, 1841-1926 at Digital.library.du.edu

1865 births
1952 deaths
People from Rochester, Minnesota
American male silent film actors
19th-century American male actors
American male stage actors
20th-century American male actors
Male actors from Minnesota